Melanophylla is a genus of flowering plants endemic to Madagascar. The genus contains seven species of small trees and shrubs.

Under the APG II system this genus was placed alone in family Melanophyllaceae, but with the rider that "[s]ome of the families are monogeneric and could possibly be merged when well-supported sister-group relationships have been established." In 2004, such a relationship was established between Melanophylla, Aralidium and Torricellia, resulting in the transfer of the first two of these genera into Torricelliaceae.

Species
 Melanophylla alnifolia Baker
 Melanophylla angustior McPherson & Rabenantoandro
 Melanophylla aucubifolia Baker
 Melanophylla crenata Baker
 Melanophylla madagascariensis Keraudren
 Melanophylla modestei G.E.Schatz, Lowry & A.-E.Wolf
 Melanophylla perrieri Keraudren

References

External links
Melanophyllaceae at the DELTA plant database
Melanophylla in a catalogue of Vascular Plants of Madagascar @ efloras.org
Melanophylla angustior (Melanophyllaceae), a new species from southeastern Madagascar (PDF file)

 
Endemic flora of Madagascar
Apiales genera
Taxa named by John Gilbert Baker